The 2nd constituency of Vendée is a French legislative constituency in the Vendée département. It elects one MP to the National Assembly of France.

Description

The 2nd Constituency of Vendée stretches from the southern half of La Roche-sur-Yon to the southern edge of the department.

Between 1988 and 2012 this constituency consistently returned conservative centre-right candidates.to the National Assembly. In 2012 the seat elected a Socialist Party deputy for the first time, followed in 2017 by Patricia Gallerneau of the MoDem.

Patricia Gallerneau, a member of the MoDem and related group, was elected to this constituency following the 2017 elections. She died from cancer in July 2019 and was replaced by her substitute Patrick Loiseau, who sits in the same group. Loiseau lost his seat in the 2022 election, and was succeeded by Béatrice Bellamy.

Assembly Members

Election results

2022

 
 
 
 
 
 
 
 
|-
| colspan="8" bgcolor="#E9E9E9"|
|-
 
 

 
 
 
 
 

* LREM dissident not supported by the Ensemble Citoyens alliance

2017

 
 
 
 
 
 
 
|-
| colspan="8" bgcolor="#E9E9E9"|
|-

2012

 
 
 
 
 
 
|-
| colspan="8" bgcolor="#E9E9E9"|
|-

2007

 
 
 
 
 
|-
| colspan="8" bgcolor="#E9E9E9"|
|-

2002

 
 
 
 
 
 
 
|-
| colspan="8" bgcolor="#E9E9E9"|
|-

1997

 
 
 
 
 
 
 
 
|-
| colspan="8" bgcolor="#E9E9E9"|
|-

References

2